Andreas Tietze was an Austrian scholar of Turkish lexicography and language.

Biography 
Tietze was born on April 26, 1914, in the early months of World War I to art historians Hans Tietze and Erica Tietze-Conrat.

He studied at the University of Vienna, focusing on economic history under Alfons Dopsch, as well as East European and Balkan history and Slavic, Turkic, Persian, and Arabic languages. He received his doctorate in 1937 with the thesis Die Stellungnahme der italienischen Wirtschaftstheoretiker des 17. Jahrhunderts zu den agrarischen Problemen.

Prior to receiving his doctorate, Tietze had already traveled to Turkey. Due to his Jewish background, the rise in Antisemitism caused him to move to Turkey in 1937. His parents relocated to the United States in 1938 for the same reason. In Turkey, Tietze accepted an offer to teach German and English at Istanbul University.

While in Turkey, Tietze furthered his studies of Turkish, publishing a Turkish reader for beginners in 1943 and serving on the editorial committee for the revised edition of James Redhouse's Turkish dictionary. In 1952, Tietze's reputation as a linguist led to an invitation to the University of Illinois. In 1957 he accepted Gustave E. von Grunebaum's invitation to join the new Near East Center at the University of California, Los Angeles. In 1974, Tietze returned to the University of Vienna to direct their Oriental Institute. While there he published translated and annotated editions of Ottoman court texts and founded the journal Turkologischer Anzeiger in an attempt to compile a bibliography of the growing number of works on Turkology.

Tietze retired from the University of Vienna in 1984, but continued to work. At age 80 he began work on an etymological dictionary of Turkish. The first volume was published in 2002. At the time of his death in 2003, he was working on the letter "S"; the remaining volumes were published posthumously.

Selected works

References 

Linguists of Turkic languages
1914 births
2003 deaths
University of Vienna alumni
Academic staff of the University of Vienna
Academic staff of Istanbul University
University of Illinois faculty
University of California, Los Angeles faculty